J C Hartman (born April 15, 1934) is an American former professional baseball player and Major League Baseball shortstop who appeared in 90 games over parts of two seasons,  and , for the Houston Colt .45s. He was nicknamed "Cool" and "The Spider", the latter because of his arms and legs, which extended to prodigious lengths when he ranged after ground balls. The ,  Hartman, a native of Cottonton, Alabama, threw and batted right-handed.

Hartman's career in minor league baseball began in 1959 at the Double-A level in the Chicago Cubs' system. He played for the Triple-A Houston Buffs in 1961 and was acquired by the expansion Colt .45s that winter before their maiden National League season. Recalled from Triple-A in midseason 1962, he backed up regular Colt .45 shortstop Bob Lillis, starting in 42 games through the end of the year and hitting .223. He then began 1963 on the Houston roster and appeared in 39 total games, 21 as a starting shortstop, before returning to the minors, where he played through 1967.

As a big leaguer, he collected 44 hits, including six doubles, and eight runs batted in.

After baseball, Hartman began what would be an historic and trail blazing career with Houston Police Department. In 1974, he became the very first African American supervisor in HPD history. Hartman was recently awarded the Lifetime Achievement Award by HPD. Before baseball Hartman was in the United States Army where he served as a Paratrooper.

External links

1934 births
Living people
21st-century African-American people
African-American baseball players
Amarillo Sonics players
American expatriate baseball players in Venezuela
Baseball players from Alabama
Denver Bears players
Hawaii Islanders players
Houston Buffs players
Houston Colt .45s players
Kansas City Monarchs players
Magic Valley Cowboys players
Major League Baseball shortstops
Oklahoma City 89ers players
People from Russell County, Alabama
San Antonio Bullets players
San Antonio Missions players
Tiburones de La Guaira players